Linda Abdul Aziz Menuhin (born 1950;) is an Iraqi-born Israeli journalist, editor, and blogger who has written for Arab news. Menuhin was a refugee to Israel in the 1970s and has been nicknamed, the "Anne Frank of Iraq". She previously served as head of the Middle East desk and commentator on Arab affairs on Arabic television channel 1. She was the subject of the 2013 Israeli documentary film Shadow in Baghdad, directed by Duki Dror.

Biography 
Menuhin was born in 1950 in Baghdad, Iraq into an Arab Jewish family. After the Six-Day War in 1967, the Jews of Baghdad became targets. At the age of 21, she fled to Israel via Pahlavi Iran with her brother. A few months later her mother and sister did the same route, and the family left behind her father. When she first arrived to Israel in 1971, there was a struggle for people to understand the history of Jews in Iraq and she has expressed feeling like, "there was no room for the Arab culture in Israel" during that time. 

In 1972 her father Yaakub Abdul Aziz, a prominent lawyer in Iraq, was abducted by government agents and was never heard of again. In the following years in Iraq, Saddam Hussein was put into power and by then many of the Baghdadi Jews had fled, were missing, or had been killed. 

The film Shadow in Baghdad is about Menuhin's family and trying to answer some of the unsolved mysteries around her father’s disappearance and the disappearance of Baghdad's Jewish population.

In 1981, Menuhin started working for Arabic television on channel 1 (Israel), first as a magazine editor and later as head of the Middle East desk. She later worked as a consultant with the Israeli Ministry of Foreign Affairs for the Arabic digital media.

See also 
 Baghdadi Jews
 History of the Jews in Iraq

References

External links 
 Interview with Linda Menuhin (2006), the National Library of Israel

1950 births
Living people
People from Baghdad
Iraqi Jews
Israeli journalists
Israeli women journalists
Israeli editors
Israeli women editors
Iraqi emigrants to Israel
Israeli Arab Jews
Channel 1 (Israel) people
Baghdadi Jews